Chester Township is one of the sixteen townships of Wayne County, Ohio, United States.  The 2000 census found 2,845 people in the township.

Geography
Located in the western part of the county, it borders the following townships:
Congress Township - north
Canaan Township - northeast corner
Wayne Township - east
Wooster Township - southeast corner
Plain Township - south
Mohican Township, Ashland County - southwest corner
Perry Township, Ashland County - west
Jackson Township, Ashland County - northwest corner

No municipalities are located in Chester Township.

Name and history
It is one of five Chester Townships statewide.

Government
The township is governed by a three-member board of trustees, who are elected in November of odd-numbered years to a four-year term beginning on the following January 1. Two are elected in the year after the presidential election and one is elected in the year before it. There is also an elected township fiscal officer, who serves a four-year term beginning on April 1 of the year after the election, which is held in November of the year before the presidential election. Vacancies in the fiscal officership or on the board of trustees are filled by the remaining trustees.

References

External links
Wayne County township map
County website

Townships in Wayne County, Ohio
Townships in Ohio